Red Deer Lake is a lake in the Canadian province of Manitoba. The primary inflow and outflow is the Red Deer River.

The lake is situated almost entirely in the north-west corner of Manitoba's Census Division No. 19, although its northernmost reaches extend into the south-west corner of Division No. 21.

While the Red Deer River is the primary inflow for the lake, there are several smaller rivers and creeks that flow into the lake too. Some of those tributaries include Grassy River, Armit River, Little Woody River, Wilson Creek, Homestead Creek, North Shore Creek, and Lost River. There are several named bays along the lake's shore, including Grassy Bay, Armit River Bay, Ellis Bay, Woody Bay, Long Point Bay, and Lost River Bay. There are no notable islands in the lake.

History
In 1901, the Red Deer Lumber Company opened a sawmill on the south shore of the lake, and built a rail spur to connect the mill to the Canadian Northern Railway line to the south.

The company also created two settlements to serve the mill: the community of Red Deer Lake was built near the mill on the lakeshore, and the community of Barrows was built at the railway junction. The sawmill closed in 1926.

Industry
The area is heavily forested, and in the years since the Red Deer Lumber Company's mill closed, the area has hosted a number of other logging companies and smaller sawmills as well. Fishing is common and fisheries in the lake and Dawson Bay process catch from Red Deer Lake. There is also coal exploration in the area as well, targeting the Mannville Formation.

See also
List of lakes of Manitoba
Assiniboine River fur trade
Fort Red Deer River
Hudson Bay drainage basin

References

Lakes of Manitoba